The broadcasts of National Hockey League (NHL) games produced by ESPN have been shown on its various platforms in the United States, including ESPN itself, ABC, ESPN+, ESPN2, ESPNEWS, ESPNU, and Hulu. Since 2021, games have been broadcast under the ESPN Hockey Night branding, while those on ESPN+ have used the ESPN+ Hockey Night branding.

ESPN first televised NHL games in the  season, initially by sub-contracting rights from individual franchises. After the NHL shifted to only having one exclusive rightsholder, ESPN acquired the NHL's national television rights in 1985 to replace USA Network (which had previously aired NHL games in parallel with ESPN). ESPN lost the rights to SportsChannel America in 1988.

ESPN regained the NHL's U.S. television rights from 1992 through the 1999–2000 season, with the coverage branded under the blanket title ESPN National Hockey Night. ESPN also sub-licensed a package of network television broadcasts to ABC (sister via ESPN parent The Walt Disney Company) under the NHL on ABC branding until 1994, when the NHL sold a broadcast television package to Fox Sports. In 1999, ESPN renewed its contract through the 2004–05 NHL season, with ABC returning as broadcast television rightsholder to replace Fox.

The 2004–05 season was cancelled due to a lockout of the NHL Players Association. ESPN had reached a two-year agreement to serve as cable rightsholder in a reduced capacity beginning in the 2005–06 season (with a smaller package of regular season games and playoff coverage primarily on ESPN2, and the first two games of the Stanley Cup Finals), alongside new broadcast rightsholder NBC. After the lockout, ESPN opted out of the contract. They were instead acquired by Comcast, with telecasts moving to Versus (later renamed NBCSN); it held the cable rights (which were later unified with NBC's broadcast television rights after Comcast's purchase of NBC Universal) through the 2020–21 season.

On March 10, 2021, the NHL announced that it would return to ESPN networks under a seven-year contract beginning in the 2021–22 season. ESPN's subscription streaming service ESPN+ provides the majority of the network's regular season NHL coverage, carrying a package of exclusive national games, and holding streaming rights to all out-of-market games (replacing the NHL.tv service). ESPN also broadcasts a package of games. ESPN and ESPN2 share coverage of the Stanley Cup playoffs with TNT and TBS — which also include exclusive rights to the Stanley Cup Finals for ABC in even-numbered years.

History

Early years: 1979–1982 and 1985–1988
This included eleven Hartford Whalers home broadcasts in 1980–81 and 25 the following year. Branded as ESPN Hockey, Sam Rosen, Barry Landers and Joe Boyle were employed as play-by-play announcers. Pete Stemkowski was the lead color commentator. During the opening round of the 1982 playoffs, ESPN broadcast Game 4 of the series between the New York Islanders and Pittsburgh Penguins and Game 2 of the series between Minnesota North Stars-Chicago Black Hawks, with Sam Rosen and Pete Stemkowski on the call. The season prior, Rosen and Stemkowski called Games 3 and 4 of the playoff series between the St. Louis Blues and Pittsburgh Penguins.

During this time, USA also broadcast National Hockey League games. In order to prevent overexposure, the NHL decided to grant only one network exclusive rights. In April 1982, USA outbid ESPN for the NHL's American national television cable package ($8 million for two years). In 1984, the NHL asked ESPN for a bid, but then gave USA the right to match it, which it did.

After the 1984–85 season, the NHL Board of Governors chose to have USA Network and ESPN submit sealed bids. ESPN won by bidding nearly $25 million for three years, about twice as much as USA had been paying. The contract called for ESPN to air up to 33 regular season games each season as well as the NHL All-Star Game and the Stanley Cup playoffs. The network chose Dan Kelly and Sam Rosen to be the network's first play-by-play announcers, Mickey Redmond and Brad Park were selected to be the analysts, and Tom Mees and Jim Kelly were chosen to serve as studio hosts. ESPN designated Sundays as ESPN Hockey Night in America, but also aired select midweek telecasts. ESPN aired its first game, an opening-night matchup between the Washington Capitals and New York Rangers, on October 10, 1985.

At the end of the  season, ESPN lost the NHL television rights to SportsChannel America, who paid $51 million ($17 million per year) over three years,  more than double what ESPN had paid ($24 million) for the previous three years. SportsChannel America managed to get a fourth NHL season for just $5 million. SportsChannel America was only available in a few major markets (notably absent though were Detroit, Pittsburgh and St. Louis) and reached only a 1/3 of the households that ESPN did at the time. In the first year of the deal, SportsChannel America was available in only 7 million homes, compared to ESPN's reach of 50 million. By the 1991–92 season, ESPN was available in 60.5 million homes, whereas SportsChannel America was available in only 25 million.

Second return to ESPN and ABC’s involvement: 1992–1999

When the SportsChannel deal ended in 1992, the league returned to ESPN for another contract that would pay US$80 million over five years. Until the 2001–02 NHL season, weekly regular season games were broadcast on Sundays (between NFL and baseball seasons), Wednesdays, and Fridays, and were titled Sunday/Wednesday/Friday Night Hockey. Prior to 1999, these telecasts were non-exclusive, meaning they were blacked out in the regions of the competing teams, and an alternate game was shown in these affected areas.

During the Stanley Cup playoffs, ESPN and ESPN2 provided almost nightly coverage, often carrying games on both channels concurrently. Games in the first two rounds were non-exclusive, while telecasts in the Conference Finals and Finals were exclusive (except in 1993 and 1994). Beginning in the 1993–94 season, up to five games per week were also shown on ESPN2, branded as NHL Fire on Ice.

Sister broadcast network ABC also aired NHL games during the first two seasons of the contract, in the league's first network television broadcasts since NBC's previous contract in the 1970s. In the first season, this included selected playoff games, and later expanded to include a package of regular season games in the second season. These telecasts were produced by ESPN, and were officially considered to be time-buys on ABC by ESPN Inc. This arrangement ended in the 1994–95 season, when the NHL began a new contract with Fox as its broadcast television partner.

Final years, and including ABC full-time: 1999–2004

In 1998, ESPN renewed its contract through 2004 for $600 million, beginning in the 1999–2000 season. Under the new contract, ESPN was permitted two exclusive telecasts per team per season, while ABC would also return as broadcast television rightsholder to replace Fox.

ESPN's terms of the deal included: up to 200 games a year split between ESPN and ESPN2, the All-Star Skills Challenge, majority of the Stanley Cup Playoffs and the first two games of the Stanley Cup Finals, while ABC's terms included: rights to the NHL All-Star Game, 4 to 5 weeks of regular season action, with three games a week, 6 weekends of Stanley Cup Playoff action, and the rest of the Stanley Cup Finals.

Beginning in 1999–2000 season, ESPN was permitted two exclusive telecasts per team per season. When ESPN started broadcasting NBA games on Wednesday and Friday nights in 2002, the weekly hockey broadcasts were moved to Thursday and the broadcasts renamed to ESPN Thursday Night Hockey.

Following the 2003–04 season, ESPN was only willing to renew its contract for two additional years at $60 million per year. ABC refused to televise the Stanley Cup Finals in prime time, suggesting that the Finals games it would telecast be played on weekend afternoons (including a potential Game 7). Disney executives later conceded that they overpaid for the 1999–2004 deal, so the company's offer to renew the television rights was lower in 2004.

Before the 2004–05 lockout, the NHL had reached two separate deals with NBC (who would replace ABC as the NHL's national  U.S. broadcast television partner) and ESPN. ESPN offered the NHL $60 million to renew its contract, carrying about 40 games (only fifteen of which would be during the regular season), mostly on ESPN2. However, ESPN opted out of the contract following the lockout, and the NHL reopened negotiations; Comcast offered over $200 million for a three-season deal to air games on OLN (a channel that was later rebranded as Versus to reflect its expansion from an outdoor recreation format to mainstream sports), which ESPN declined to match. After Comcast acquired a majority stake in NBC Universal in 2011, it renewed both the broadcast television and cable rights to the league via NBC Sports through the 2020–21 season.

World Cup of Hockey: 2016

Long after losing their broadcasting rights to the NHL, ESPN served as the U.S. broadcaster of the NHL-backed 2016 World Cup of Hockey, as NBC declined due to programming conflicts. For the tournament, ESPN named Steve Levy and Barry Melrose as the lead broadcast team, while adding Kevin Weekes from NHL Network, Leah Hextall from Sportsnet, NHL Hall of Famers Chris Chelios and Brett Hull to their roster. ESPN also named NHL Hall of Famers Chris Chelios and Brett Hull as their studio analyst.

Additionally, ESPN brought back current St. Louis Blues color commentator Darren Pang, who was the network's secondary color commentator from 1999 to 2004, for their coverage, as an “Inside the Glass” reporter for select games. John Saunders, who had hosted ESPN and ABC's NHL coverage from 1987 to 1988 and again from 1992 to 2004, was tapped to lead the studio coverage, however, due to his unexpected death a month after ESPN announced their complete roster, Cohn, who was originally going to do features for ESPN, was tapped to replace Saunders.

ESPN+ involvement: 2018–present
After its 2018 launch, ESPN's subscription streaming service ESPN+ added an NHL studio program, a free daily regular season game courtesy of NHL.tv (which is operated by Disney subsidiary BAMTech), and a Stanley Cup Playoffs documentary series (replacing one produced as part of Showtime's All Access franchise). As part of the NHL.tv deal, ESPN+ started a nightly hockey show, In the Crease, hosted by Linda Cohn and Barry Melrose.

Third return to ESPN and ABC: 2021–present
In the years before the end of NBC's latest contract with the NHL, the league explored options for splitting its national broadcast rights, similar to the television deals of the NFL, NBA and MLB. This included selling packages to streaming services, aiming to maximize the value of its broadcast rights. On March 10, 2021, Disney, ESPN, and the NHL announced that a seven-year agreement was reached for ESPN to hold the first half of its new media rights beginning in the 2021–22 season;

 ESPN will hold rights to at least 25 exclusive national games per season, which can air on either ESPN, ESPN2, or ABC, including exclusive rights to opening night games. Games on ABC stream on ESPN+.
75 exclusive national games per season will be streamed exclusively on ESPN+, and will not be carried on linear television. These games will also be available to Hulu subscribers.
ESPN+ will stream all out-of-market games, as well as on-demand versions of all nationally televised games.
 ESPN will hold rights to All-Star Weekend, with the Skills Competition airing on ESPN, and the All-Star Game airing on ABC.
 ESPN will hold rights to the NHL Entry Draft.
 ESPN, ESPN2, and ABC will share in coverage of the Stanley Cup playoffs, holding rights to "half" of the games in the first two rounds, and one conference final per-season. ESPN/ABC will have the first choice of which conference final series to air. The remaining half will air on TNT and TBS.
 Exclusive rights to the Stanley Cup Finals will alternate between ABC and TNT; ESPN will have the ability to air simulcast coverage with alternate feeds on its other channels and platforms.
 ESPN2 airs a weekly studio program dedicated to the NHL, The Point (which is hosted by John Buccigross), and ESPN will hold various highlights and international rights.

On May 10, 2021, Andrew Marchand of the New York Post reported that TSN’s Ray Ferraro (who previously worked for ESPN from 2002 to 2004), and NBC’s Brian Boucher had signed with ESPN to become their top hockey analysts. On May 17, ESPN hired former Calgary Flames studio host Leah Hextall to be a regular play-by-play announcer on NHL broadcasts. She is the first woman in league history to hold that role. Hextall previously worked the 2016 World Cup of Hockey, and has worked the NCAA Division I Men's Ice Hockey Tournament for ESPN.

On June 9, 2021, ESPN announced that current New Jersey Devils defenseman P.K. Subban would be a studio analyst for the remainder of the 2021 Stanley Cup Playoffs, making his debut on SportsCenter that day. The same day, Craig Morgan, Arizona-based reporter on the Arizona Coyotes and NHL Network correspondent, reported that ESPN had added NBC's Ryan Callahan and A. J. Mleczko to their analyst roster, and that NHL Network's Kevin Weekes, who also worked for ESPN during the 2016 World Cup of Hockey, was in talks to return to ESPN in an analyst/reporter role. Marchand later reported that Weekes had signed with ESPN, and that Bob Wischusen, who currently calls play-by-play for ESPN's college football and basketball broadcasts, will also work NHL broadcasts.

On June 24, ESPN officially announced that six-time Stanley Cup Champion Mark Messier had signed a multi-year deal to join ESPN in a studio analyst role. Messier's signing was the first announced signing made by ESPN, and potentially was made as a counter to TNT signing Messier's former teammate Wayne Gretzky, who was also recruited by ESPN. On June 28, Marchand reported that three time Stanley Cup Champion Chris Chelios would also join ESPN as a studio analyst. The same day, The Athletic reported that current Hockey Night in Canada color commentator/reporter Cassie Campbell-Pascall would also join ESPN.

ESPN formally confirmed its commentator teams on June 29, 2021. ESPN's college football #2 play-by-play man Sean McDonough would be the network's lead play-by-play announcer; Monday Night Football’s Steve Levy would lead studio coverage and contribute to occasional play-by-play commentary. Hextall and Wischusen were officially named as play-by-play commentators, as well as SportsCenter’s John Buccigross, who will also contribute as an alternate studio host, and serve as the host for The Point. ESPN legend Barry Melrose, Messier, and Chelios were named strictly as studio analysts while Ferraro, Boucher, Weekes, Campbell-Pascall, Callahan, Mleczko, ESPN New York’s Rick DiPietro, and 2018 gold medalist Hilary Knight would contribute as booth, Inside the Glass, and studio analysts. 2016 Isobel Cup champion Blake Bolden was added to join insiders Emily Kaplan and Greg Wyshynski as insiders and rinkside reporters. Linda Cohn continued her duties hosting In the Crease, while also gaining roles as a rinkside reporter, backup studio, and game break host. On August 4, 2021, ESPN announced that they added most recent Blue Jackets coach and Stanley Cup winning coach John Tortorella as an extra studio analyst.

On September 16, after ESPN released their slate of games for the 2021–22 season, SportsCenter anchor and ESPN Social host Arda Ocal would announce himself that he too would host select game broadcasts. On October 2, former referee Dave Jackson joined the network as a rules analyst, an NHL first. Early into the 2021–22 season, ESPN added former NBC analyst Dominic Moore, who had hosted the Expansion Draft with Weekes and ESPN College Football personality Chris Fowler. Laura Rutledge, host of NFL Live and SEC Nation, joined the NHL on ESPN team for their coverage of the 2022 NHL All-Star Game, in a celebrity interviewer role. After preparing for and playing in the 2022 Winter Olympics in Beijing, Knight made her ESPN debut on the March 10, 2022, episode of “The Point”, coincidentally on the one-year anniversary of ESPN regaining the rights to broadcast the NHL. Bolden, who has been working as a pro scout for the Los Angeles Kings since 2020, made her official ESPN on-air debut a week later. After the regular season kicked into high gear, Knight and Bolden were the only two who still had to make their on-air debuts with ESPN.

Occasionally, other well known ESPN personalities like Jeremy Schaap, Kevin Connors, Michael Eaves, and Max McGee will be added in fill-in roles on The Point and In the Crease. Mike Monaco, Roxy Bernstein, and Caley Chelios, daughter of Chris, have also filled in on game coverage. Subban and TSN's Gord Miller, Ferraro's broadcast partner for Maple Leafs games on TSN, joined ESPN for the Stanley Cup Playoffs. Tortorella left ESPN after their first season to become the new head coach of the Philadelphia Flyers. After holding two stints with ESPN during the playoffs, the network announced that Subban would be joining their coverage full-time beginning with the 2022–23 season, holding both studio analyst and color commentator roles. This came after his most recent retirement announcement.

ESPN also confirmed that Spanish language coverage of the NHL would air on ESPN Deportes and ESPN Latin America. Kenneth Garay and Eitán Benezra would be the main play-by-play commentators, while Carlos Rossell and Antonio Valle contribute analysis and color commentary. Rigoberto Plascencia was later added as another play-by-play announcer.

For the 2021–22 season, ESPN aired 18 games (billed as ESPN Hockey Night), while 75 exclusive national games per season would be streamed exclusively on ESPN+. For the 2021–22 season, most of these games (billed as ESPN+ Hockey Night) aired on Tuesday and Thursday nights, with selected games on Friday nights. These games will also be available to Hulu subscribers. ESPN's first broadcasts were an opening night doubleheader, with the Pittsburgh Penguins at the defending Stanley Cup champions Tampa Bay Lightning, and the Seattle Kraken at the Vegas Golden Knights in the Kraken's first regular-season game in franchise history.

Typically, games aired on ESPN, excluding ESPN+ games, are simulcast in Canada on the Sportsnet channels, using the ESPN feed. However, on January 17, 2022, TSN, which is partly owned by ESPN, simulcast the ESPN+ feed of the Arizona Coyotes–Montreal Canadiens game because of a huge snowstorm in Canada, which prevented the Canadiens’ broadcast team from traveling south to Glendale to broadcast the game.

For the 2022–23 season, out-of-market games on ESPN+ – which did not carry any specific branding in the inaugural season – were branded as "NHL Power Play on ESPN+". ESPN (34) and ESPN2 (1) aired a combined at least 35 games (billed as ESPN Hockey Night), while ABC aired 15 games under the ABC Hockey Saturday package, which will consist of 4 doubleheaders, the 2023 NHL Stadium Series, and one late-season tripleheader beginning the weekend after the All-Star break.

Alternate broadcasts 

Since the beginning of ESPN's current NHL contract, the network has occasionally presented alternate broadcasts of games on ESPN+, including "Star Watch" (which featured camera angles focused on specific star players), "IceCast" (which featured a higher camera angle and on-screen statistics), and "All-12" (an alternate camera angle of the entire ice during the 2023 NHL Stadium Series game, inspired by ESPN's "All-22" feeds for college football).

On March 14, 2023, ESPN presented an alternate youth-oriented broadcast of that night's Washington Capitals–New York Rangers game known as the NHL Big City Greens Classic, simulcast on Disney Channel, Disney XD, and Disney+; the broadcast leveraged the league's player and puck tracking system to render a real-time 3D animated perspective of the game based on the Disney Channel animated series Big City Greens.

On-air staff

Current personalities

Studio hosts 
 Steve Levy: studio host (1993–2004), lead studio host, alternate “The Point”, and “In the Crease” host (2021–present), play-by-play (1993–2004, 2021–present)
 John Buccigross: alternate “In the Crease” host (2018–present), alternate studio host (1998–2004, 2021–present), “The Point” host and play-by-play (2021–present)
 Arda Ocal: alternate studio, “The Point”, and “In the Crease” host (2021–present)
 Linda Cohn: “In the Crease” host (2018–present), alternate studio host and game break host, Inside the Glass reporter, and contributor (2021–present; reporter for select games)
 Kevin Weekes: color commentator, ice-level reporter, studio analyst, insider, fill-in studio and “The Point” host (2021–present)

The Point hosts
 John Buccigross: alternate “In the Crease” host (2018–present), alternate studio host (1998–2004, 2021–present), “The Point” host and play-by-play (2021–present)
 Arda Ocal: alternate studio, “The Point”, and “In the Crease” host (2021–present)
 Jeremy Schaap: contributor and fill-in “The Point” host (2021–present; also on OTL and E:60)
 Steve Levy: lead studio host, alternate “The Point”, and “In the Crease” host (2021–present), play-by-play (1993–2004, 2021–present) 
 Kevin Weekes: color commentator, ice-level reporter, studio analyst, insider, fill-in studio and “The Point” host (2021–present)

In the Crease hosts
 Linda Cohn: “In the Crease” host (2018–present), alternate studio host and game break host, Inside the Glass reporter, and contributor (2021–present; reporter for select games)
 John Buccigross: alternate “In the Crease” host (2018–present), alternate studio host (1998–2004, 2021–present), “The Point” host and play-by-play (2021–present)
 Arda Ocal: alternate studio, “The Point”, and “In the Crease” host (2021–present)
 Steve Levy: lead studio host, alternate “The Point”, and “In the Crease” host (2021–present), play-by-play (1993–2004, 2021–present) 
 Michael Eaves: fill-in “In the Crease” host (2022–present)
 Kevin Connors: fill-in “In the Crease” host (2022–present)
 Max McGee: fill-in “In the Crease” host (2022–present)
 Ashley Brewer: fill-in “In the Crease” host (2023–present)

Studio analysts
 Barry Melrose: studio analyst/color commentator (1996–2004, 2021–present)
 Mark Messier: lead studio analyst/color commentator (2021–present)
 Chris Chelios: lead studio analyst/color commentator (2021–present)
 Rick DiPietro: studio analyst (2021–present)
 Kevin Weekes: color commentator, ice-level reporter, studio analyst, insider, fill-in studio and “The Point” host (2021–present)
 Ryan Callahan: color commentator/Inside the Glass reporter/studio analyst (2021–present)
 Dominic Moore: color commentator/Inside the Glass reporter/studio analyst (2021–present)
 Hilary Knight: studio analyst/Inside the Glass reporter (2022–present)
 Brian Boucher: lead color commentator/Inside the Glass reporter/studio analyst (2021–present)
 A. J. Mleczko: color commentator/Inside the Glass reporter/studio analyst (2021–present)
 P. K. Subban: lead studio analyst/color commentator (2022–present)

Play-by-play 
 Sean McDonough: play-by-play (1993–1994, 1999–2000, 2002–2004), lead play-by-play (2021–present)
 Bob Wischusen: #2 play-by-play (2021–present)
 Steve Levy: studio host (1993–2004), lead studio host, alternate “The Point”, and “In the Crease” host (2021–present), #3 play-by-play (1993–2004, 2021–present) 
 John Buccigross: alternate studio host (1998–2004, 2021–present), “The Point” host and #4 play-by-play (2021–present)
 Mike Monaco: #5 play-by-play (2022–present)
 Roxy Bernstein: #6 play-by-play (2022–present)
 Leah Hextall: #7 play-by-play, Inside the Glass, and ice-level reporter (2021–present)
 Gord Miller: Playoffs play-by-play (2022–present)
 Drew Carter: NHL Big City Greens Classic play-by-play (2023-present)

Color commentators (Booth and Inside the Glass)
 Ray Ferraro: studio analyst (2002–2004), lead color commentator/Inside the Glass reporter (2021–present)
 Brian Boucher: #2 color commentator/Inside the Glass reporter/studio analyst (2021–present)
 A. J. Mleczko: color commentator/Inside the Glass reporter/studio analyst (2021–present)
 Dominic Moore: color commentator/Inside the Glass reporter/studio analyst (2021–present)
 Kevin Weekes: color commentator, ice-level reporter, studio analyst, insider, fill-in studio and “The Point” host (2021–present)
 Ryan Callahan: color commentator/Inside the Glass reporter/studio analyst (2021–present)
 Cassie Campbell-Pascall: color commentator (2021–present)
 Hilary Knight: studio analyst/Inside the Glass reporter (2022–present)
 Mark Messier: lead studio analyst/color commentator (2021–present)
 Chris Chelios: lead studio analyst/color commentator (2021–present)
 Barry Melrose: color commentator/lead studio analyst (1996–2004, 2021–present)
 P. K. Subban: studio analyst/color commentator (2022–present)

Reporters (Inside the Glass and ice level) 
 Emily Kaplan: insider, lead Inside the Glass, and ice level reporter (2021–present)
 Leah Hextall: play-by-play, Inside the Glass, and ice-level reporter (2021–present)
 Linda Cohn: “In the Crease” host (2018–present), alternate studio host and game break host, Inside the Glass reporter, and contributor (2021–present; reporter for select games)
 Kevin Weekes: color commentator, ice-level reporter, studio analyst, insider, fill-in studio and “The Point” host (2021–present)
 Caley Chelios: Inside the Glass and ice-level reporter (2022–present)

Rules analyst 
 Dave Jackson – rules analyst (2021–present)

Insiders 
 Emily Kaplan: insider, lead Inside the Glass, and ice level reporter (2021–present)
 Greg Wyshynski: insider (2021–present)
 Kevin Weekes: color commentator, ice-level reporter, studio analyst, insider, fill-in studio, and “The Point” host (2021–present)

Contributors 
 Linda Cohn: “In the Crease” host (2018–present), alternate studio host and game break host, Inside the Glass reporter, and contributor (2021–present; reporter for select games)
 Jeremy Schaap: contributor and fill-in “The Point” host (2021–present; also on OTL and E:60)
 Laura Rutledge: All-Star contributor (2022–present)
 Michael Collins: All-Star contributor (2023–present)
 Blake Bolden: contributor (2022–present)
 Meghan Chayka: analytics and draft expert (2022–present)

Ratings

References

External links 
 

1980 American television series debuts
1982 American television series endings
1985 American television series debuts
1988 American television series endings
1992 American television series debuts
2004 American television series endings
2021 American television series debuts
2020s American television series
National Hockey Night
National Hockey Night
National Hockey League on television
American television series revived after cancellation
Sports telecast series